Fort William Lighthouse is located on the Dawson's Hill in the old centre of Cape Coast, in Ghana's Central Region. The lighthouse is often called Cape Coast Castle Light, although it is not part of the Cape Coast Castle complex. Along with the Cape Coast Castle and other castles and forts in Ghana, the lighthouse was inscribed on the UNESCO World Heritage List in 1979 because of its historical importance. 

The building was first constructed by the British under Governor Hope-Smith in 1820, and it was named Smith's Tower. In the 1830s, it was reconstructed with more durable materials and renamed Fort William. Since then, it has served as a lighthouse.

Currently, the building houses Ghana Museums & Monuments Board staff (GMMB). Fort William is well maintained and open to visitors.

Gallery

See also
List of lighthouses in Ghana

References 

History of Ghana
Castles in Ghana
Lighthouses in Ghana